The Magazine Mountain middle-toothed snail, also known as the Magazine Mountain shagreen, scientific name Inflectarius magazinensis, is a species of small, air-breathing, land snails, terrestrial pulmonate gastropod molluscs in the family Polygyridae.

Distribution 
This species is endemic to Mount Magazine in Arkansas, the United States. Its natural habitat is rocky areas.

Conservation efforts 
The Magazine Mountain shagreen was listed as threatened on April 17, 1989. Thanks to efforts from the U.S. Forest Service, US Fish and Wildlife Service, and the Arkansas Department of Parks and Tourism, the snail was removed from the endangered list in May 2013. The shagreen is the first invertebrate ever removed from the federal endangered species list.

References

Polygyridae
Molluscs of the United States
Endemic fauna of Arkansas
Critically endangered fauna of the United States
Gastropods described in 1907
Taxa named by Henry Augustus Pilsbry
Taxonomy articles created by Polbot